Christopher Ryan Opie (born 22 July 1987) is a British cyclist from England, who currently rides for UCI Continental team . Outside of racing, Opie has been a contributor and presenter for the Global Cycling Network.

Career

Born in Truro, Cornwall, Opie grew up on a small beef and dairy farm. He attended Kea Primary and Penair Secondary Schools in Truro. He began cycling competitively at the age of 10 and progressed to lead the British National Junior RR Series in 2005.

In 2006, Opie raced in France for UC Aubenas and he battled with a slight eating disorder and, in 2007, with Glandular Fever, but returned to racing in 2008, when he was based in the Netherlands and Belgium. He returned from the Netherlands to ride for Pendragon Sports/Le Col/Colnago in 2010, and when the team wound up at the end of the 2011 season he was signed by Nigel Mansell's . 

After one season with the team he was announced as part of the inaugural squad for the  team for the 2015 season. Opie announced his retirement from competition in May 2018 immediately before his final race, the last round of that year's Tour Series in Salisbury. Opie's retirement was a financial decision, following the bankruptcy of one of the team sponsors which led to a halving of riders' salaries.

In January 2019, Opie joined Global Cycling Network as a presenter. However the transition away from racing was not without difficulty and as Opie described himself, led to a minor breakdown suffering from post-traumatic stress disorder (PTSD). Opie decided to make a return to racing in 2020, with the  team, despite there being no races held during the period of the COVID-19 pandemic.

Personal life
Opie and his wife Meike have two children together. He is the brother-in-law of Dutch former racing cyclist Remco van der Ven.

Major results

2010
 1st GP Al Fatah
 Tour of Libya
1st Stages 4 & 5
2012
 6th Ster van Zwolle
2013
 Tour Series
1st Round 8 – Canary Wharf & Round 10 – Aylsham
 2nd Overall Tour of the Reservoir
1st Stage 1
2014
 2nd National Circuit Race Championships
 2nd Circuit of the Fens
 2nd Ipswich and Coastal Grand Prix
 3rd Otley Grand Prix
 3rd Wales Open Criterium
 4th Eddie Soens Memorial
 4th Grand Prix des Marbriers
 5th Colne Grand Prix
2015
 1st Stockton Grand Prix
 2nd Perfs Pedal Race
 2nd Rutland–Melton International CiCLE Classic
 3rd Overall Totnes-Vire Stage Race
1st Stage 2
 3rd Chepstow Grand Prix
 7th Overall Ronde van Midden-Nederland
2016
 1st  Overall Ronde van Midden-Nederland
1st Stages 1 (TTT) & 2
 1st Stage 2 Tour de Korea
 2nd Arnhem–Veenendaal Classic
 8th Grand Prix de Denain
2017
 7th Ronde van Drenthe
2018
 8th PWZ Zuidenveld Tour

References

External links

Tour Series blog #7: Chris Opie in Woking, Cycling Weekly 15 June 2011

1987 births
Living people
English male cyclists
Sportspeople from Truro